This is a list of Roman Catholic dioceses in the Balkans i.e. dioceses of the Latin Church. In Balkanic Europe, the Roman Catholic Church comprises 8 episcopal conferences, 14 ecclesiastical provinces, 31 suffragan dioceses and 1 apostolic administration. There are 5 archdioceses, 3 dioceses, and 1 apostolic vicariate that are immediately subject to the Holy See.

List of dioceses

Episcopal Conference of Albania

Ecclesiastical Province of Shkodër-Pult
Archdiocese of Shkodër-Pult
Diocese of Lezhë
Diocese of Sapë

Ecclesiastical Province of Tiranë-Durrës
Archdiocese of Tiranë-Durrës
Diocese of Rrëshen
Apostolic Administration of Southern Albania

Episcopal Conference of Bosnia

Ecclesiastical Province of Sarajevo
Archdiocese of Vrhbosna
Diocese of Banja Luka
Diocese of Mostar-Duvno
Diocese of Skopje
Diocese of Trebinje-Mrkan

Episcopal Conference of Croatia

Ecclesiastical Province of Rijeka
Archdiocese of Rijeka
Diocese of Gospić–Senj
Diocese of Krk
Diocese of Poreč i Pula

Ecclesiastical Province of Sirmio
Archdiocese of Djakovo-Osijek
Diocese of Požega
Diocese of Srijem

Ecclesiastical Province of Split-Makarska
Archdiocese of Split-Makarska
Diocese of Dubrovnik
Diocese of Hvar
Diocese of Kotor
Diocese of Šibenik

Ecclesiastical Province of Zagreb
Archdiocese of Zagreb
Eparchy of Križevci
Diocese of Varaždin

Episcopal Conference of Greece

Ecclesiastical Province of Corfù, Zante e Cefalonia
Archdiocese of Corfù, Zante e Cefalonia

Ecclesiastical Province of Naxos, Andros, Tinos e Mykonos
Archdiocese of Naxos, Andros, Tinos and Mykonos
Diocese of Chios
Diocese of Crete
Diocese of Santorini
Diocese of Syros e Milos

Episcopal Conference of Romania

Ecclesiastical Province of Bucharest
Archdiocese of Bucharest
Diocese of Iaşi
Diocese of Oradea Mare
Diocese of Satu Mare
Diocese of Timişoara

Episcopal Conference of Serbia

Ecclesiastical Province of Beograd
Archdiocese of Beograd
Diocese of Subotica
Diocese of Zrenjanin

Episcopal Conference of Slovenia

Ecclesiastical Province of Ljubljana
Archdiocese of Ljubljana
Diocese of Koper
Diocese of Novo Mesto

Ecclesiastical Province of Maribor
Archdiocese of Maribor
Diocese of Celje
Diocese of Murska Sobota

Immediately subject to the Holy See
Archdiocese of Alba Iulia
Archdiocese of Athenai
Archdiocese of Bar
Diocese of Nicopoli
Apostolic Administration of Prizren
Archdiocese of Rhodos
Diocese of Sofia and Plovdiv
Apostolic Vicariate of Thessaloniki
Archdiocese of Zadar

Balkans
Balkans
Balkan culture